Sumit Narwal (born 1982) is an Indian cricketer who plays for Delhi and the Kolkata Knight Riders.

References

Indian cricketers
1982 births
Living people
Rajasthan Royals cricketers
Place of birth missing (living people)
Haryana cricketers
Delhi cricketers
North Zone cricketers
India Green cricketers
Kolkata Knight Riders cricketers